Kyle Wayne Davis (October 1, 1952) is a former American football center in the National Football League (NFL) for the Dallas Cowboys and San Francisco 49ers. He played college football at the University of Oklahoma.

Early years
Davis attended Altus High School before moving on to the University of Oklahoma. He spent his first two years as a backup at center, behind All-American Tom Brahaney.

As a junior, he was named the starting center after Brahaney graduated.

As a senior, he was a key part of the school's championship team, receiving third-team All-American and second-team All-Big Eight honors.  He was considered a powerful blocker in the team's record-setting wishbone offense and also served as a long snapper.

Professional career

Dallas Cowboys
Davis was selected by the Dallas Cowboys in the fifth round  (113th overall) of the 1975 NFL Draft, also known as the Dirty Dozen draft. As a rookie, he was the backup center and was used mainly on special teams and as a long snapper.

In the divisional playoffs against the Minnesota Vikings, when John Fitzgerald hurt his right elbow and had trouble snapping the ball in the shotgun formation, Davis took over the center duties in the last minutes of the game with a 14-10 deficit. Roger Staubach proceeded to hit Drew Pearson on a sideline route to convert a 4th-and-16 play and then both connected again on the famous Hail Mary pass.

In 1976, he was lost for the season with a knee injury and was placed on the injured reserve list on August 23. He was waived on August 1, 1977.

Minnesota Vikings
On August 9, 1977, he was claimed off waivers by the Minnesota Vikings. He was released on September 13.

New England Patriots
On May 3, 1978, he signed with the New England Patriots, but was waived to make room for Bob McKay on August 15.

Detroit Lions
On August 17, 1978, he was claimed him off waivers by the Detroit Lions. He was released before the season started.

San Francisco 49ers
On November 3, 1978, he signed with the San Francisco 49ers and got a chance to play in 7 regular season games.
He was waived on August 1, 1979.

New York Giants
On August 6, 1979, the New York Giants claimed him off waivers. He was released on August 13.

References

1952 births
Living people
People from Washita County, Oklahoma
Players of American football from Oklahoma
American football centers
Oklahoma Sooners football players
Dallas Cowboys players
San Francisco 49ers players